LogRhythm, Inc. is an American security intelligence company that specializes in Security Information and Event Management (SIEM), log management, network and endpoint monitoring and forensics, and security analytics. LogRhythm is headquartered in Boulder, Colorado, with operations in North and South America, Europe, and the Asia Pacific region.

LogRhythm was founded in 2003 by Chris Petersen and Phillip Villella. Originally based in Washington, DC, under the name Security Conscious, Inc., the company changed its name to LogRhythm and relocated to Boulder, Colorado, in 2005.

LogRhythm NextGen SIEM Platform combines log management, machine learning, user and entity behavior analytics (UEBA), network traffic and behavior analytics (NTBA), and security orchestration automation and response (SOAR) into a single platform. The main components of LogRhythm’s XDR Stack include AnalytiX, DetectX, and RespondX. These integrated sets of capabilities allow for threat monitoring, threat hunting, threat investigation, and incident response. LogRhythm also offers add-on solutions to its NextGen SIEM Platform, such as UserXDR (an UEBA solution that can be deployed through various configurations including on-premise, SaaS, and hybrid), and NetworkXDR (a network traffic analysis solution).

In 2019, LogRhythm released a cloud-based version of the NextGen SIEM Platform, LogRhythm Cloud, to provide a Software as a Service (SaaS).

In 2020, LogRhythm launched version 7.5 of the LogRhythm NextGen SIEM Platform and released its Open Collector technology in order to onboard cloud data sources for holistic monitoring.

LogRhythm's platform is used to ensure compliance with mandates in the US and UK including Payment Card Industry Data Security Standard (PCI DSS), critical infrastructure protection (NERC CIP), Sarbanes–Oxley Act (S-OX), or other government regulations.

Patents

See also 
 Loggly
 Sumo Logic
 Splunk
 LogDNA
 Prelude SIEM (Intrusion Detection System)

References

External links
 

Companies based in Boulder, Colorado
Computer security companies
Software companies based in Colorado
American companies established in 2003